Mahay Chattha is a small village  from the city of Kamoke Gujranwala. It is a beautiful village famous for its daffodils. It produces best rice in the world, which is not only rich in taste but also have a natural and aromatic flavour. Mahay Chattha has been ruled by Ch Peer Muhammad Chattha and his sons for years. His elder son Ch Muhammad Yousaf Chattha, who is also known as numberdar, is getting elected from years as a chairman of his union council.

References

Villages in Gujranwala District